Hanna Arkhipenka-Vasilionak (born 16 January 1983 in Minsk) is a modern pentathlete from Belarus. At the 2012 Summer Olympics, she competed in the women's competition, where she finished in thirty-second place.

Vasilionak also won a team gold medal at the 2007 World Modern Pentathlon Championships in Berlin, Germany.

References

External links
 

Belarusian female modern pentathletes
1983 births
Living people
Olympic modern pentathletes of Belarus
Modern pentathletes at the 2008 Summer Olympics
Modern pentathletes at the 2012 Summer Olympics
World Modern Pentathlon Championships medalists
Sportspeople from Minsk
21st-century Belarusian women